Blue screen, Blue Screen or bluescreen may refer to:
 Blue Screen of Death, a fatal system error screen in Microsoft Windows
 Blue–white screen, an assay useful in biotechnology
 Chroma key or blue screen compositing, a technique for combining two still images or video frames
 Blue Screen (novel), a 2006 novel by Robert B. Parker